The 2016–17 Vermont Catamounts women's basketball team will represent the University of Vermont during the 2016–17 NCAA Division I women's basketball season. The Catamounts, led by first year head coach Chris Day, played their home games in the Patrick Gym are members in the America East Conference.

Media
All non-televised home games and conference road games will stream on either ESPN3 or AmericaEast.tv. Select home games will be televised by the Northeast Sports Network. Most road games will stream on the opponents website. All games will be broadcast on WVMT 620 AM and streamed online through SportsJuice.com with Rob Ryan calling the action.

Roster

Schedule

|-
!colspan=12 style="background:#008000; color:#FFD700;"| Exhibition

|-
!colspan=12 style="background:#008000; color:#FFD700;"| Non-conference regular season

|-
!colspan=12 style="background:#008000; color:#FFD700;"| America East regular season

|-
!colspan=12 style="background:#008000; color:#FFD700;"| America East Women's Tournament

See also
 2016–17 Vermont Catamounts men's basketball team

References

Vermont
Vermont Catamounts women's basketball seasons
2016 in sports in Vermont
2017 in sports in Vermont